In the history of video games, the fourth generation of video game consoles, more commonly referred to as the 16-bit era, began on October 30, 1987, with the Japanese release of NEC Home Electronics' PC Engine (known as the TurboGrafx-16 in North America). Though NEC released the first console of this era, sales were mostly dominated by the rivalry between Sega and Nintendo across most markets: the Sega Mega Drive (Sega Genesis in North America) and the Super Nintendo Entertainment System (SNES; Super Famicom in Japan). Cartridge-based handheld consoles became prominent during this time, such as the Nintendo Game Boy (1989), Atari Lynx (1989), Sega Game Gear (1990) and TurboExpress (1990).

Nintendo was able to capitalize on its success in the previous, third generation, and managed to win the largest worldwide market share in the fourth generation as well. Sega, however, was extremely successful in this generation and began a new franchise, Sonic the Hedgehog, to compete with Nintendo's Super Mario series of games. Several other companies released consoles in this generation, but none of them were widely successful. Nevertheless, there were other companies that started to take notice of the maturing video game industry and begin making plans to release consoles of their own in the future.  While as with prior generations, game media still continued to be primarily provided on ROM cartridges, though the first optical disk systems, such as the Philips CD-i, were released to limited success. As games became more complex, concerns over video game violence, namely in titles such as Mortal Kombat and Night Trap, led to the eventual creation of the Entertainment Software Rating Board.

The emergence of fifth generation video game consoles, circa 1994, did not significantly diminish the popularity of fourth generation consoles for a few years. In 1996, however, there was a major drop in sales of hardware from this generation and a dwindling number of software publishers supporting fourth generation systems, which together led to a drop in software sales in subsequent years. This generation ended with the discontinuation of the Neo Geo in 2004.

Differences from third generation consoles

Features that distinguish some fourth generation consoles from third generation consoles include:

 16-bit microprocessors
 Multi-button game controllers with many buttons (3 to 8)
 Parallax scrolling of multi-layer tilemap backgrounds
 Large sprites (up to 64×64 or 16×512 pixels), 80–380 sprites on screen, 16–96 sprites per scan line
 Elaborate color, 64 to 4096 colors on screen, from palettes of 512 (9-bit) to 65,536 (16-bit) colors
 Stereo audio, with multiple channels and digital audio playback (PCM, ADPCM, streaming CD-DA audio)
 Advanced music synthesis (FM synthesis and/or wavetable sample-based synthesis)

Additionally, in specific cases, fourth generation hardware featured:

 Backgrounds with pseudo-3D scaling and rotation
 Sprites that can individually be scaled and rotated
 Flat-shaded 3D polygon graphics
Surround sound support
 CD-ROM support via add-ons, allowing larger storage space and full motion video playback

Home systems

TurboGrafx-16

The PC Engine was the result of a collaboration between Hudson Soft and NEC and launched in Japan on October 30, 1987. It launched under the name TurboGrafx-16 in North America on August 29, 1988.

Initially, the PC Engine was quite successful in Japan, partly due to titles available on the then-new CD-ROM format. NEC released a CD add-on in 1990 and by 1992 had released a combination TurboGrafx and CD-ROM system known as the TurboDuo.

In the United States, NEC used Bonk, a head-banging caveman, as their mascot and featured him in most of the TurboGrafx advertising from 1990 to 1994. The platform was well received initially, especially in larger markets, but failed to make inroads into the smaller metropolitan areas where NEC did not have as many store representatives or as focused in-store promotion.

The TurboGrafx-16 failed to maintain its sales momentum or to make a strong impact in North America. The TurboGrafx-16 and its CD combination system, the Turbo Duo, ceased manufacturing in North America by 1994, though a small amount of software continued to trickle out for the platform.

Mega Drive/Genesis

The Mega Drive was released in Japan on October 29, 1988. The console was released in New York City and Los Angeles on August 14, 1989, under the name Sega Genesis, and in the rest of North America later that year. It was launched in Europe and Australia on November 30, 1990, under its original name.

Sega built their marketing campaign around their new mascot Sonic the Hedgehog, pushing the Genesis as the "cooler" alternative to Nintendo's console and inventing the term "Blast Processing" to suggest that the Genesis was capable of handling games with faster motion than the SNES. Their advertising was often directly adversarial, leading to commercials such as "Genesis does what Nintendon't" and no scream at all.

When the arcade game Mortal Kombat was ported for home release on the Genesis and Super Nintendo Entertainment System, Nintendo decided to censor the game's gore, but Sega kept the content in the game, via a code entered at the start screen. Sega's version of Mortal Kombat received generally more favorable reviews in the gaming press and outsold the SNES version three to one. This also led to Congressional hearings to investigate the marketing of violent video games to children, and to the creation of the Interactive Digital Software Association and the Entertainment Software Rating Board. Sega concluded that the superior sales of their version of Mortal Kombat were outweighed by the resulting loss in consumer trust, and cancelled the game's release in Spain to avoid further controversy. With the new ESRB rating system in place, Nintendo reconsidered its position for the release of Mortal Kombat II, and this time became the preferred version among reviewers. The Toy Retail Sales Tracking Service reported that during the key shopping month of November 1994, 63% of all 16-bit video game consoles sold were Sega systems.

The console was never popular in Japan (being regularly outsold by the PC Engine), but still managed to sell 40 million units worldwide. By late 1995, Sega was supporting five different consoles and two add-ons, and Sega Enterprises chose to discontinue the Mega Drive in Japan to concentrate on the new Sega Saturn. While this made perfect sense for the Japanese market, it was disastrous in North America: the market for Genesis games was much larger than for the Saturn, but Sega was left without the inventory or software to meet demand.

Super NES

Nintendo executives were initially reluctant to design a new system, but as the market transitioned to the newer hardware, Nintendo saw the erosion of the commanding market share it had built up with the Nintendo Entertainment System. Nintendo's fourth-generation console, the Super Famicom, was released in Japan on November 21, 1990; Nintendo's initial shipment of 300,000 units sold out within hours. The machine reached North America as the Super Nintendo Entertainment System on August 23, 1991, and Europe and Australia in April 1992.

Despite stiff competition from the Mega Drive/Genesis console, the Super NES eventually took the top selling position, selling 49.10 million units worldwide, and would remain popular well into the fifth generation of consoles. Nintendo's market position was defined by their machine's increased video and sound capabilities, as well as exclusive first-party franchise titles such as F-Zero, Starfox, Donkey Kong Country, Super Mario Kart, Super Mario World, The Legend of Zelda: A Link to the Past and Super Metroid.

Compact Disc Interactive (CD-i)

The CD-i format was announced in the late 1980s, with the first machines compatible with the format being released in 1991. The Philips CD-i's main selling point was that it was more than a game machine and could be used for multimedia needs. Due to an agreement between Nintendo and Philips about an abortive CD add-on for the SNES (which eventually evolved into Sony's PlayStation), Philips also had rights to use some of Nintendo's franchises. The CD-i was a commercial failure and was discontinued in 1998, selling only 1 million units worldwide despite several partnerships and multiple versions of the device, some made by other manufacturers.

Neo Geo

Released by SNK in 1990, the Neo Geo was a home console version of the major arcade platform. Compared to its console competition, the Neo Geo had much better graphics and sound, however the prohibitively expensive launch price of US$649.99 and games often retailing at over $250 made the console only accessible to a niche market. A less expensive version, retailing for $399.99, did not include a memory card, pack-in game or extra joystick.

Add-ons
Nintendo, NEC and Sega also competed with hardware peripherals for their consoles in this generation. NEC was the first with the release of the TurboGrafx CD system in 1990. Retailing for $399.99 at release, the CD add-on was not a popular purchase, but was largely responsible for the platform's success in Japan. The Sega CD was released with an unusually high price tag ($300 at its release) and a limited library of games. A unique add-on for the Sega console was Sega Channel, a subscription-based service (a form of online gaming delivery) hosted by local television providers. It required hardware that plugged into a cable line and the Genesis.

Nintendo also made two attempts with the Satellaview and the Super Game Boy. The Satellaview was a satellite service released only in Japan and the Super Game Boy was an adapter for the SNES that allowed Game Boy games to be displayed on a TV in color. Nintendo, working along with Sony, also had plans to create a CD-ROM drive for the SNES (plans that resulted in a prototype version of the Sony PlayStation), but eventually decided not to go through with that project, opting to team up with Philips in the development of the add-on instead (contrary to popular belief, the CD-i was largely unrelated to the project).

European importing

The fourth generation was also the era when the act of buying imported US games became more established in Europe, and regular stores began to carry them. The PAL region has a refresh rate of 50 Hz (compared with 60 Hz for NTSC) and a vertical resolution of 625 interlaced lines (576 effective), compared with 525/480 for NTSC. Because the simulation speed of contemporary game systems was directly linked to the output frame rate, which was in turn synchronized with the TV's refresh rate, this meant that the game would run more slowly on a PAL television. The smaller number of vertical lines in the NTSC signal would also lead to black bars appearing on the top and bottom of a PAL television. Developers often had a hard time converting games designed for the American and Japanese NTSC standard to the European and Australian PAL standard. Companies such as Konami, with large budgets and a healthy following in Europe and Australia, readily optimized several games (such as the International Superstar Soccer series) for this audience, while most smaller developers did not.

Also, few RPGs were released in Europe because the market for the genre was not as large as in Japan or North America, and the increasing amount of time and money required for translation as RPGs became more text-heavy, in addition to the usual need to convert the games to the PAL standard, often made localizing the games to Europe a high-cost venture with little potential payoff. As a result, RPG releases in Europe were largely limited to games which had previously been localized for North America, thus reducing the amount of translation required.

Popular US games imported at this time included Final Fantasy IV (known in the US as Final Fantasy II), Final Fantasy VI (known in the US as Final Fantasy III), Secret of Mana, Street Fighter II, Chrono Trigger, and Super Mario RPG.  Secret of Mana and Street Fighter II would eventually receive official release in Europe, whilst Final Fantasy IV, Final Fantasy VI, Chrono Trigger and Super Mario RPG would be released in Europe years later on other consoles or formats outside of this generation.

Comparison

CD-supported consoles

Other consoles

Worldwide sales standings

Handheld systems

The first handheld game console released in the fourth generation was the Game Boy, on April 21, 1989. It went on to dominate handheld sales by an extremely large margin, despite featuring an 8-bit microprocessor and a low-contrast, unlit monochrome screen while all three of its leading competitors had color. Three major franchises made their debut on the Game Boy: Tetris, the Game Boy's killer application; Pokémon; and Kirby. With some design (Game Boy Pocket, Game Boy Light) and hardware (Game Boy Color) changes, it continued in production in some form until 2008, enjoying a better than 18-year run.

The Atari Lynx included hardware-accelerated color graphics, a backlight, and the ability to link up to sixteen units together in an early example of network play when its competitors could only link 2 or 4 consoles (or none at all), but its comparatively short battery life (approximately 4.5 hours on a set of alkaline cells, versus 35 hours for the Game Boy), high price, and weak games library made it one of the worst-selling handheld game systems of all time, with less than 500,000 units sold.

The third major handheld of the fourth generation was the Game Gear. It featured graphics capabilities roughly comparable to the Master System (better colours, but lower resolution), a ready made games library by using the "Master-Gear" adaptor to play cartridges from the older console, and the opportunity to be converted into a portable TV using a cheap tuner adaptor, but it also suffered some of the same shortcomings as the Lynx. While it sold more than twenty times as many units as the Lynx, its bulky design – slightly larger than even the original Game Boy; relatively poor battery life – only a little better than the Lynx; and later arrival in the marketplace – competing for sales amongst the remaining buyers who did not already have a Game Boy – hampered its overall popularity despite being more closely competitive to the Nintendo in terms of price and breadth of software library. Sega eventually retired the Game Gear in 1997, a year before Nintendo released the first examples of the Game Boy Color, to focus on the Nomad and non-portable console products.

Other handheld consoles released during the fourth generation included the TurboExpress, a handheld version of the TurboGrafx-16 released by NEC in 1990, and the Game Boy Pocket, an improved model of the Game Boy released about two years before the debut of the Game Boy Color. While the TurboExpress was another early pioneer of color handheld gaming technology and had the added benefit of using the same game cartridges or 'HuCards' as the TurboGrafx16, it had even worse battery life than the Lynx and Game Gear – about three hours on six contemporary AA batteries – selling only 1.5 million units.

List of handheld consoles

Other handheld game consoles

Software

Milestone titles 
 Chrono Trigger (SNES) by Square is frequently listed among the greatest video games of all time.
 Dragon Quest V and VI (SFC) by Chunsoft, Heartbeat, and Enix were released on the Japanese Super Famicom, as well as remakes of the first three games originally released for the NES and a dungeon crawler spin-off: Torneko's Great Adventure, which started Chun Soft's popular Fushigi no Dungeon series.
 Donkey Kong Country (SNES) by Rare and Nintendo turned the tide of the console war in favor of Nintendo and became the best-selling game since Super Mario Bros. 3, largely due to its impressive graphics.
 FIFA International Soccer (Genesis, SNES) by Extended Play Productions and EA Sports has been described as one of the most influential sports games ever made.
 Garou: Mark of the Wolves (Arcade, Neo Geo AES) by SNK is considered one of the best fighting games, as well as the "swan song" of the generation. receiving praise for its hand-drawn graphics, and the game's tight and streamlined control scheme.
 Gunstar Heroes (Genesis) by Treasure and Sega is considered one of the best action games of the generation.
 John Madden Football (1990) (Genesis, SNES) by Park Place Productions and EA Sports played an important role in the early success of both the Genesis console and Electronic Arts.
 Super Metroid (SNES) by Nintendo Research & Development 1 and Nintendo is still regarded by many gaming organizations as one of the "best games of all time."
 Mortal Kombat (Arcade, Genesis, SNES) by Midway Games garnered heated controversy over its violent themes, with the uncensored Genesis version outselling the SNES version by nearly three-to-one, ultimately leading to a U.S. Congressional hearing and the creation of the Entertainment Software Rating Board.
 NHLPA Hockey '93 (Genesis, SNES) by Park Place Productions and EA Sports is considered one of the most outstanding sports games ever made.
 Phantasy Star II (Genesis) by Sega Consumer Development Division 2 and Sega has been cited as one of the best and most influential console RPGs.
 Secret of Mana (SNES) by Square reintroduced the Seiken Densetsu series, originally conceived as a Final Fantasy spin-off, to Europe and North America.
 Sonic the Hedgehog (Genesis) by Sonic Team and Sega was Sega's bid to compete head-to head with Nintendo's Mario franchise, played a critical role in the success of the Genesis, and received widespread critical acclaim as one of the greatest games ever made, kickstarting a successful franchise.
 Street Fighter II (Arcade, Genesis, SNES) by Capcom was the second game in the series to produce a lasting fanbase and set many of the trends seen in fighting games today, most notably its colorful selection of playable fighters from different countries across the globe. As of 2008, it is Capcom's best-selling consumer game of all time.
 Streets of Rage 2 (Genesis) by Sega AM7 and Sega is considered the best beat 'em up of the generation.
 Super Monaco GP (Arcade, Genesis) by Sega set a new standard for realism in console racing games.
 Super Mario World 2: Yoshi's Island (SNES) by Nintendo Entertainment Analysis & Development (Nintendo EAD) and Nintendo is considered perhaps the finest 2D platformer.
 The Legend of Zelda: A Link to the Past (SNES) by Nintendo EAD and Nintendo courted popularity that was larger than that of its predecessors on the NES. It was one of the few action-adventures to be released early in the SNES's lifecycle. Zelda II on the NES had been mostly action-based and was side-scrolling, while A Link to the Past drew more inspiration from the original Zelda game with its top-down adventure format.
 Thunder Force IV (Genesis) by Technosoft is considered one of the best shooters on the Genesis, receiving praise for its graphics, including the vertical and parallax scrolling for illustrating the immense environments.
 Ys Book I & II (TurboGrafx) by Nihon Falcom was among the first video games mass released on CD-ROM, when released in Japan in 1989 and in North America in 1990. In addition to receiving praise for its story and gameplay, the game pioneered several technical features, such as voice acting, animated cut scenes, and pre-recorded soundtracks, which would become industry standards later in the decade.

See also

 Capcom Power System Changer
 Konix Multisystem
 Fifth generation of video game consoles

Notes

References 

 
History of video game consoles 04
04
.Consoles04
.Consoles04
.Consoles04
1980s video games
1990s video games
2000s video games
Video game consoles04
Video game consoles04
Video game consoles04